Igor Yurievich Savochkin (14 May 1963 – 17 November 2021) was a Russian theater and film actor.

He died in Moscow on 17 November 2021, at the age of 58 due to liver disease.

Filmography

Films

TV Series

Music videos
 I'm Not a Sorceress –  Nadezhda Kadysheva
Heat –  Yulia Chicherina
 Girl in the City –  Vyacheslav Butusov

References

External links

1963 births
2021 deaths
People from Saratov Oblast
Russian male film actors
Russian male television actors
20th-century Russian male actors
21st-century Russian male actors
Russian male stage actors
Russian television presenters
Saratov Conservatory alumni
Saratov State Agrarian University alumni